The Canadian Jewish News is a non-profit, national, English-language digital-first media organization that serves  Canada‘s Jewish community. A national edition of the newspaper was published for 60 years in Toronto. A weekly Montreal edition in English with some French began its run in 1976. The newspaper announced its closure in 2013 but was able to continue after restructuring and reorganizing. It again announced its closure on April 2, 2020, due to the impact of the COVID-19 pandemic in Canada on its finances. Its final weekly print edition was published on April 9, 2020. In December 2020, it announced its return as a digital-first media company  with a new president, Bryan Borzykowski.

History
The ‘’Canadian Jewish News’’ was founded by M. J. Nurenberger, a friend of Menachem Begin and supporter of his Herut party, and his wife Dorothy and was first published on Friday, January 1, 1960, and was the first exclusively English-language Jewish newspaper published in Ontario.

The CJN was considered a “provocative” paper into the 1970s but was later considered something of a “lapdog for the community”. The original CJN hewed a line that supported the right in Israeli politics and was critical of the liberal leadership of the Canadian Jewish community at the time as well as community institutions such as B'nai Brith and the United Jewish Appeal, the latter for its secrecy in how it dispersed money. According to his daughter, Atara Beck, “He believed that a newspaper should be a thorn in the side of the establishment.”

In 1971, following the death of his wife, Nurenberger sold the newspaper for $30,000 to a group of community leaders that included Shoppers Drug Mart founder Murray Koffler and real estate developer Albert Latner and was led by philanthropist and businessman Ray Wolfe. Though independent, the newspaper has been owned, since 1971, by a group of Jewish leaders allied with what was then the Canadian Jewish Congress.

Nurenburger soon regretted his decision, discouraged by the new version of the paper’s reticence to challenge the community’s establishment, and started the ‘’Jewish Times’’ in 1974, which was decidedly more right wing than CJN under its new management, and continued publication into the early 1990s. In 1979, it adopted editorial guidelines that prevent articles from criticizing the state of Israel’s security policies.

By 2013, the CJN had a circulation of 40,000 copies per week.

Suspension
On April 22, 2013, the newspaper issued termination notices to its 50 staff and announced that it will cease printing with its June 20 edition due to financial constraints. The publishers sought benefactors to provide funding that would allow the CJN to continue as an exclusively online publication less reliant on advertising.

Resumption of publication and second closure 
On June 14, 2013, the CJN’s board announced that it would resume publication of its print edition in August 2013 after moving to smaller offices and pending the results of a subscription and advertising drive and various changes to the newspaper’s business model. Among others, editor Mordechai Ben-Dat and senior staffer and columnist Sheldon Kirshner were let go.

The newspaper was subsequently reorganized under new leadership, and with a drastically reduced staff, beginning in January 2014, with Elizabeth Wolfe, daughter of Ray Wolfe, becoming president and former Jerusalem Report, National Post and Maclean's journalist Yoni Goldstein becoming the newspaper’s editor. Goldstein subsequently introduced a more diverse range of contributors to the newspaper. The content of the newly revamped paper was described as “racier” and was more reliant on freelancers.

By 2016, the newspaper’s subscriptions remained mostly unchanged at 31,000, but Wolfe reported advertising and subscription revenues were enough to invest in new projects.

The paper announced that it would cease publication with its 9 April 2020 issue, with its final circulation estimated at 32,000. It had suffered from financial shortfalls for years, which were exacerbated by the impact of the coronavirus pandemic in Canada on its finances. CJN president Elizabeth Wolfe stated that “The CJN suffered from a pre-existing condition and has been felled by COVID-19.”

Revival in digital form 

In May 2021, The CJN resumed publication once again, for the first time without a physical weekly newspaper. Instead, it returned at a new website, thecjn.ca, which resumed its reporting tradition. In addition, a new email newsletter was created, as well as several weekly podcasts, including Bonjour Chai, hosted by Rabbi Avi Finegold and actors Ilana Zackon and David Sklar; Menschwarmers, about Jews and sports; Yehupetzville, hosted by CBC veteran Ralph Benmergui; A Few of My Favourite Jews and Shticks & Giggles, interview shows by Yuk Yuks comedian Laura Leibow; and The CJN Daily, a daily newscast hosted by Ellin Bessner, author of Double Threat.

In March 2021, The CJN printed their first magazine for past subscribers. It will continue publishing on a quarterly schedule in 2022.

Contributors 
Notable contributors to the newspaper have included Jacob Elbaz, J. B. Salsberg, who was a featured columnist in the newspaper for several decades until shortly before his death in 1998, and Rabbi Gunther Plaut, who also contributed a weekly column for many years. In its final years, Bernie Farber and Barbara Kay were weekly columnists.

The main Toronto edition of the CJN had a rotating group of guest columnists: among them were academics Norma Baumel Joseph and Norman Ravvin of Concordia University; Sarah Horowitz of York; Gil Troy of McGill; Gerald Steinberg of Bar-Ilan University, as well as Jean Gerber in Vancouver, and Rabbi Dow Marmur and Avrum Rosensweig in Toronto. (The Montreal edition featured some others.)

References

External links
Canadian Jewish News

See also
List of newspapers in Canada

National newspapers published in Canada
Jewish newspapers published in Canada
Newspapers published in Toronto
Newspapers published in Montreal
Weekly newspapers published in Ontario
English-language newspapers published in Quebec
Weekly newspapers published in Quebec
Defunct weekly newspapers
Newspapers established in 1960
Publications disestablished in 2020
1960 establishments in Canada
2020 disestablishments in Canada
1960 establishments in Ontario
2020 disestablishments in Ontario
1960 establishments in Quebec
2020 disestablishments in Quebec
Defunct newspapers published in Canada
Defunct newspapers published in Ontario
Defunct newspapers published in Quebec